Askeaton GAA club is a Gaelic Athletic Association club based in the village of Askeaton in County Limerick, Ireland. The club participates in competitions organized by the Limerick GAA county board.

History

The pitch played host to Munster football championship games in 1970, (1987- 1991) known as Páirc na nGael.

Achievements
 Limerick Senior Football Championship: (3) 1965, 1966, 1972
 Limerick Minor Football Championship: (4) 1959, 1960, 1975, 1976
 Limerick Junior Hurling Championship: (1) 1935
 Limerick Intermediate Football Championship: (1) 1992

References

Gaelic games clubs in County Limerick
Hurling clubs in County Limerick
Gaelic football clubs in County Limerick